The River Music Experience is a multi-use music facility and 501(c)3 non-profit organization located on the first two floors of the historic Redstone Building in downtown Davenport, Iowa.  

The River Music Experience is the home of the RME Cafe, a coffee shop (1st floor) and live music venue, Redstone Room (2nd floor). RME Cafe and its community stage plays host to over 150 performances per year. These range from a weekly open mic night to the top local bands, and are typically open to the public and free of charge. The Redstone Room is a state-of-the-art music venue hosting national and regional acts that play original music. 

The River Music Experience offers a broad array of educational programming including Rock Camp USA (a branch of the highly successful school launched by the Austin School of Music), the Sound Lab educational recording studio (offering a 24-week, 96-hour certification in Audio Production), traditional music lessons, weekly open mic nights, monthly jazz jams, the "Songwriters in the Round" workshops, monthly Community Drum Circle, Winter Blues workshop series, and the ongoing River Currents Tours - a co-production with the Figge Art Museum which introduces grade-school students to the history of American roots music. 

For the past five years, the River Music Experience has organized River Roots Live, an annual two-day music festival held on the banks of the Mississippi River in Davenport's LeClare Park. The festival has featured acts like Little Feat, The BoDeans, Edgar Winter, the Black Crowes, Junior Brown, Umphrey's McGee, Greg Brown, America, Alejandro Escovedo, and many others.

See also
 List of music museums

References

External links
 River Music Experience
 The Redstone Room
 The Sound Lab
 River Roots Live
 Rock Camp USA

Museums in Davenport, Iowa
Music venues in Iowa
Culture of the Quad Cities